Dunfield may refer to:

Dunfield, Newfoundland and Labrador, Canada
Dunfield, Gloucestershire, a hamlet of Kempsford in England

People with the surname
Hugh Clifford Dunfield (1891–1973), Canadian provincial politician
Kari Dunfield (fl. 1995–2018), Canadian agrometeorologist
Nathan Dunfield (born 1975), American mathematician
Peter Dunfield (c. 1931–2014), Canadian figure skater and coach
Sonya Klopfer Dunfield (born 1934), American competitive figure skater and coach
Terry Dunfield (born 1982), Canadian soccer player

See also
 Denfield, a heritage-listed property in New South Wales, Australia
 Duffield (disambiguation)